William Moore (born 1950) is an Irish retired hurler who played as a right corner-back for the Limerick senior hurling team.

Moore made his first appearance for the team during the 1971 championship and became a regular player over the next few seasons. During that time he won one All-Ireland winners' medal and back-to-back Munster winners' medals.

At club level Moore enjoyed a lengthy career with Doon, however, he ended his career without claiming a county club championship winners' medal.

Playing career

Club

Moore played his club hurling with his local Doon club.

Inter-county

Moore first came to prominence as a member of the Limerick senior inter-county team in the early 1970s. In 1973 he won his first Munster Championship medal, Limerick's first since 1955.  Limerick later faced Kilkenny in the All-Ireland final, however, the Munster champions were burdened with the underdogs tag.  In spite of this Limerick powered to a seven-point victory, giving Moore an All-Ireland medal.

In 1974 Moore won a second consecutive Munster title before lining out in a second consecutive All-Ireland final.  Once again Kilkenny provided the opposition.  Limerick stormed to an early lead, however, a Pat Delaney shot from midfield bounced on the wet Croke Park surface and between goalkeeper Séamus Horgan's legs for a goal.  Two more goals for Kilkenny put an end to Limerick's hopes of victory as 'the Cats' emerged the winners by twelve points.

Horgan continued hurling at inter-county level until 1974.

References 

1950 births
Living people
Doon hurlers
Limerick inter-county hurlers
All-Ireland Senior Hurling Championship winners